Rocco Morabito may refer to:
 Rocco Morabito (mobster, born 1960), Italian criminal and member of the 'Ndrangheta
 Rocco Morabito (mobster, born 1966), Italian criminal and member of the 'Ndrangheta
 Rocco Morabito (photographer), American photographer